Grant Connell and Scott Davis were the defending champions, but Connell did not compete this year. Davis teamed up with Kelly Jones and lost in the quarterfinals to Geoff Grant and Mark Merklein.

Luke Jensen and Murphy Jensen won the title by defeating Neville Godwin and Fernon Wibier 6–4, 6–4 in the final.

Seeds
The top four seeds received a bye to the second round.

Draw

Finals

Top half

Bottom half

References

External links
 Official results archive (ATP)
 Official results archive (ITF)

1997 ATP Tour